National Route 1D is a road in South Central Coast of Vietnam. It connects Route 1 (QL1) to Quy Nhơn and continues along the coast to Sông Cầu District in Phú Yên Province rejoining QL1A.

The total length of the route is 33 km. The route runs along the coastal tourist area South of Quy Nhon to Sông Cầu.

Road layout
Route 1D runs through the following places:

Quy Nhơn, Bình Định province, where it connects with QL1
Tuy Phong
Sông Cầu District, Phú Yên province, where it connects with QL1

Specifications
Total length: 33 km
Road width: 10 m
Road surface: paved with asphalt

References

Vietnam Road Map Book (Tập Bản đồ Giao thông Đường bộ Việt Nam) revision 2004 by Vietnam Map Publishing House.

1D